South Caldwell High School (SCHS) is a public high school in Hudson, North Carolina. It is part of the Caldwell County Schools district.

History
The construction of South Caldwell High School was completed on August 25, 1977. SCHS is located on a  site in Caldwell County, between Hudson and Granite Falls. Granite Falls Middle School and Hudson Middle School feed into South Caldwell.

Academics
The school provides an academic program ranging from courses for students having special needs, to standard courses, or honors and Advanced Placement (AP) courses. Student needs are enriched through a comprehensive program centering in the basic subjects of English, math, social studies and science, with tutoring provided free of charge before and after school.  Individual assistance is provided for each student in the completion of a career pathway.

Block scheduling is used with two nine-weeks grading periods per semester.  Grade point average and class rank are computed using the state-weighted scale at the end of each semester.  The cumulative average is based on four years, beginning with the ninth grade. Starting with the 2015–16 school year a new grading scale was put into effect with A= 100–90, B= 89–80, C= 79–70, D= 69–60, F= 59 and below.

South Caldwell High School is approved and accredited by the North Carolina Department of Public Instruction and the Southern Association of Colleges and Schools.

Media and technology
The media center is an integral part of the academic atmosphere of the school.  The facility houses over 17,000 volumes supplementing all subject areas.  Students have flexible access to the media center resources and its thirty networked computers that access the electronic reference databases and the internet.  A thirty computer lab for activities such as word processing, creating presentations, webquests, and Internet research.  An additional thirty computer lab utilizes the Passkey software to support and enhance the standard course of study.

Extracurricular activities

There are many clubs and extracurricular activities that students can be involved in. Below is a list of clubs/extracurricular activities at South Caldwell that a student can be a part of:

 AFS
 Anime
 Book Talk
 DECA
 GSA
 Drama Club
 FCA
 FBLA
 FFA
 HOSA
 ITS
 Interact Club
 Math Club
 Media Tech
 Model UN
 Unified Champions
 Quiz Bowl
 Rock It Radio
 Robotics Club
 Senior Officers
 Skills USA
 Spirit Club
 Spanish Club
 Student Council
 Trading Card Club
 Trio ETS
 Volunteens
 Winter Guard
 Tutoring
 NTHS
 Student Activities
 Junior National Beta Club
 The National Beta Club
 Dance Team
 NJROTC
 Band
 Chorus
 Theater
 Publications Staff
 Equity Club
 Citizens of the World Club

Athletics
South Caldwell High School is part of the North Carolina High School Athletic Association (NCHSAA). South Caldwell is classified as a 4A school, and are members of the Northwestern 3A/4A conference. Listed below are the different sports South Caldwell has to offer:

 Baseball
 Basketball
 Competition Cheerleading
 Cross Country
 Football
 Golf
 Marching Band
 Soccer
 Softball
 Swimming
 Tennis
 Track & Field
 Volleyball
 Wrestling

Notable alumni
Madison Bumgarner, MLB pitcher, 3x World Series Champion for the San Francisco Giants, 2014 World Series MVP
Eric Church, country music singer/songwriter
Landon Dickerson, NFL offensive lineman for the Philadelphia Eagles
Donnie Kirkpatrick, college football coach

References

External links
Official website
South Caldwell High - School Profile

Schools in Caldwell County, North Carolina
Educational institutions established in 1977
Public high schools in North Carolina
1977 establishments in North Carolina